The 1905–06 season was Stoke's 17th season in the Football League.

It was a good season for Stoke as they started well winning their first five matches and with a number of good local players in the team playing regularly. Stoke's form did eventually drop and they finished in 10th position a much improved finish from previous seasons. However it would be a case of 'calm before the storm' for Stoke and their supporters.

Season review

League
For the 1905–06 season, the First Division was extended to 20 clubs. Stoke enticed goalkeeper Leigh Richmond Roose back to the club whilst James Bradley departed for Liverpool. The 'Potters' started the season off in fine style winning their opening five matches to go top of the league table for the first time in their history–and they remained there for five weeks. Horace Austerberry seemed to have found the right line-up and managed to keep it settled for the first seven matches. The crowds improved steadily and they reached the 12,000 mark as Stoke began to play well at home.

In early November Sheffield Wednesday were well beaten 4–0 with Ted Holdcroft scoring twice, to bring his goals tally to six in ten games unfortunately for Holcroft it was also his final goals of the season. Stoke's decent form continued but George Baddeley injured his knee on boxing day and Stoke's form began to drop. They eventually finished in 10th position with 39 points 12 behind champions Liverpool.

FA Cup
Stoke again went out of the cup in the second round this time losing 1–0 to Birmingham after beating Blackburn Rovers by the same score.

Final league table

Results
Stoke's score comes first

Legend

Football League First Division

FA Cup

Squad statistics

References

Stoke City F.C. seasons
Stoke